Lynn Spout is a waterfall on the Caaf Water near Dalry in Ayrshire in  Scotland.

See also
Waterfalls of Scotland

References

Waterfalls of North Ayrshire